Cressy or de Cressy is a surname. Notable people with the name include: 

 David Cressy, American historian and professor
 Gordon Cressy (b. 1943), Canadian politician
 Harold Cressy (1889–1916), South African headteacher and activist
 Hugh de Cressy (d. 1189), Anglo-Norman administrator and nobleman
 Hugh Cressy (MP), Member of Parliament for Nottinghamshire
 Joe Cressy, (b. 1984), Canadian politician
 Maxime Cressy (b. 1997), American tennis player
 Serenus de Cressy (c. 1605–1674), English monk